Tanyard Branch is a stream in Pike County in the U.S. state of Missouri. It is a tributary of the Salt River.

Tanyard Branch was so named on account of a historical tanyard near its course.

See also
List of rivers of Missouri

References

Rivers of Pike County, Missouri
Rivers of Missouri